William Lamb (7 September 1835 – 23 March 1909) was an American newspaper editor, politician, businessman, and soldier, noted for his role as a Confederate States Army officer in commanding the Confederate garrison at Fort Fisher at the mouth of the Cape Fear River during the Civil War.

Life

Early years
William Lamb was born in Norfolk, Virginia to William Wilson and Margaret Kerr Lamb. He studied in the Rappahannock Military Academy before attending the College of William & Mary at Williamsburg, Virginia, where he received a degree in law.

After his 1855 return to the family home, Kenmure in Norfolk, Lamb became the co-owner and co-editor with A. F. Leonard of the Southern Argus, a Norfolk newspaper. He entered local politics and was elected a delegate to the Democratic National Convention; in 1860 he was a Presidential elector on the Democratic ticket of John C. Breckinridge and Joseph Lane.

Civil War

Lamb was active in the state militia and commanded the Woodis Rifles, a militia company raised in Norfolk, Virginia in 1858 and named after Hunter Woodis, the city mayor. It was sent in 1859 to Harpers Ferry during John Brown's raid on Harpers Ferry. 

On 24 September 1861, he was commissioned major and appointed quartermaster on the staff of Brigadier General Joseph R. Anderson. He initially oversaw Fort St. Philip located 15 miles south of Wilmington, North Carolina, which was on July 1, 1863 renamed Fort Anderson. In 1862, Lamb was elected as the colonel of the 36th North Carolina Regiment. 

On 4 July 1862, Colonel Lamb assumed command of Fort Fisher. Located on the narrow Federal Point peninsula, it protected the New Inlet, which led into the Cape Fear River and thus was critical for the operation of the Port of Wilmington. When he arrived, he observed in his words "... a small work, part of it constructed of perishable sand bags and its longest face was about one hundred yards. Out of its half dozen large guns, only the two eight-inch Columbiads were suitable for seacoast defense. One of the Federal frigates could have cleaned it out with a few broad-sides.” 

Although not trained as an engineer, he was interested in military fortifications and studied their role in the Crimean War, especially, the Russian fortress of Malakoff at Sevastopol. Lamb spent two-and-a-half years working relentlessly to construct the Confederacy's largest bastion at a length of seven hundred yards that became known as the South’s Gibraltar.

Recognizing Fort Fisher's strategic value to the Confederacy, he successfully defended the fort against a Union attack led by Benjamin Butler and David Dixon Porter on December 24–26, 1864. Two weeks later, in January 1865, Alfred Terry, who replaced Butler, and Admiral Porter led a renewed attack against the fort. They were able to assemble a prevailing force of 8,000 aided by over 600 guns on ships against fewer than 2,000 defenders of the fort. Despite fierce fighting by Lamb and his garrison for two days, the fort was captured. The Confederate losses stood at about 500 men; the Union toll was near three times more. 

Lamb was grievously wounded and taken prisoner. He was sent to U.S. Army's Chesapeake Hospital at Fort Monroe, Virginia. There, he met with Union Col. Newton Martin Curtis, who himself was badly wounded and lost an eye during the Second Battle of Fort Fisher. They developed a friendship and later worked together on calming tensions between the North and South.

Later years
Lamb eventually recovered, becoming from 1880 to 1886 the mayor of Norfolk, Virginia as his father and grandfather had been before him. Initially a member of the Democratic Party, he joined the Republican Party in 1882. In 1900, he was made a Knight of the Order of Vasa, for his services as consul for Sweden and Norway. He died in Norfolk on 23 March 1909 and is buried there in Elmwood Cemetery. His personal papers are held by the Special Collections Research Center at the College of William & Mary.

His family home at Norfolk, Kenmure, was listed on the National Register of Historic Places in 1988.

References

Further reading
 Lamb, William: editor, soldier, and man of business, National cyclopedia of American Biography, Vol. 1.
 Lamb, William. Colonel Lamb's Story of Fort Fisher; The Battles Fought Here in 1864 and 1865. Carolina Beach, N.C.: Blockade Runner Museum, 1966.
 Lamb, William, Newton Martin Curtis, Darlene Bright, and Leslie S. Bright. My Friend the Enemy: The Battle at Fort Fisher As Recalled by Colonel Lamb, CSA & General Curtis, USA: from Post War Addresses and Written Accounts of the Conflict. Carolina Beach, N.C.: Federal Point Historic Preservation Society, 2007.
 William Lamb. The Life and Times of Colonel William Lamb, 1835–1909: Patriot, Benefactor, Statesman. Austin, Texas: 2000.
 Walker, James L., Jr. Rebel Gibraltar: Fort Fisher and Wilmington, C.S.A. Wilmington, NC: Dram Tree Books, 2005.

External links
William Lamb (1835-1909), North Carolina Historic Sites: Teaching through our historic sites
Finding aid for the William Lamb Papers
Find a Grave: William Lamb

1835 births
1909 deaths
College of William & Mary alumni
Confederate States Army officers
Mayors of Norfolk, Virginia
Knights of the Order of Vasa